is a very small near-Earth asteroid of the Apollo group, approximately  in diameter. It was first observed by the Mount Lemmon Survey on 28 January 2019, just hours after the asteroid's sub-lunar flyby of Earth at less than 0.12 lunar distance.

Orbit and classification 

 is an Apollo asteroid, the largest subgroup of near-Earth objects. It orbits the Sun at a distance of 0.96–3.6 AU once every 3 years and 6 months (1,268 days; semi-major axis of 2.29 AU). Its orbit has a high eccentricity of 0.58 and an inclination of 11° with respect to the ecliptic. The body still has a high orbital uncertainty of 5 and 7, respectively. Its observation arc of only 8 days begins with its official first observation at Mount Lemmon Observatory on 28 January 2019.

Close approaches 

 Flybys

Numbering and naming 

This minor planet has not yet been numbered by the Minor Planet Center and remains unnamed.

Physical characteristics 

 has an undetermined spectral type. Based on a generic magnitude-to-diameter conversion, the asteroid measures approximately 6 meter in diameter for an assumed albedo of 0.15 and absolute magnitude 28.8. The estimated diameter may vary between 5 and 10 meters depending on whether an albedo for a dark carbonaceous (0.05) or a bright stony (0.25) asteroid is assumed.

See also 
 List of asteroid close approaches to Earth in 2019

References

External links 
 2019 BZ3 -- Very small Apollo-class Asteroid, spacereference.org
 2019 BZ3 Geometry, International Asteroid Warning Network
 MPEC 2019-B142: 2019 BZ3, MPC, 2019 Jan. 29, 12:24 UT
 Near-Earth Object Observations Program, 24 NASA, June 2019
 Asteroid Lightcurve Database (LCDB), query form (info )
 
 
 

Minor planet object articles (unnumbered)
Discoveries by MLS
Near-Earth objects in 2019
20190128